The 1907 Tennessee Volunteers football team represented the University of Tennessee in the 1907 Southern Intercollegiate Athletic Association football season.  Led by new head coach George Levene, the Volunteers had their first seven-win season in team history.

Schedule

References

Tennessee
Tennessee Volunteers football seasons
Tennessee Volunteers football